Chew Valley in Saddleworth, Greater Manchester, England, follows the course of Chew Brook on the western slopes of Black Chew Head to where it joins the River Tame at Greenfield, east of Manchester. Part of the higher fringes of the valley towards the peak of Black Chew Head lie across the boundary in Derbyshire. The eastern part of the valley including the reservoirs of Dovestone and Chew are within the north western extremity of the Peak District National Park.

Chew Reservoir was completed in 1912. A tram-road was laid in Chew Valley to transport  of clay to make an inner core for its dam to make it watertight. The tram and railway are gone but the route forms the Oldham Way long-distance footpath; reconstructed bridge hosts a sign with information, pictures, and a map.

In 1949, a BEA Douglas DC3 crashed into the hill at Wimberry Rocks killing 24 passengers and crew and leaving 8 survivors.

Chew Brook

The Chew Brook begins as a small stream on the western slopes of Black Chew Head , part of Saddleworth Moor and the highest point of Greater Manchester. Travelling westward down the slope, it is joined by several other streams including the Black Chew Grain. After running for approximately 1 km through marshy moorland, the brook empties into the Chew Reservoir , built in 1912 and the highest constructed reservoir in England  at the time ( above sea level; Cow Green Reservoir, near Middleton in Teesdale in County Durham, is the current holder, completed in 1971). Excerpts from a labourer's description of working on the dam at Chew Valley are available in the book Navvyman by Dick Sullivan.

At the western end of the reservoir the brook emerges down a narrow and steep ravine, curving steadily to the northwest for  before this time emptying into Dovestone Reservoir . Exiting the western end of Dovestone, the brook – now a small river – meanders through the heart of Greenfield village. Chew Brook ends its journey a short distance below Greenfield railway station where it flows into the River Tame .

Tributaries
Greenfield Brook (R)
Dove Stone Brook (L)
Near Deep Brook (R)
Far Deep Brook(R)
Craggy Brook (R)
Near Rough Brook (R)
Far Rough Brook (R)
Near Warmsey Brook (R)
Holme Brook (Rs)
Rimmon Pit Brook (R)
Little Brook (R)
Great Gruff (R)
Little Holme Brook (L)
Birchen Brook (Ls)
Little Birchen Brook (L)
Howels Head Brook (R)
North Grain (R)
Charnel Brook (R)
Dish Stones Brook (R)
Bower Brook (L)
Green Grain (L)
Black Chew Grain (R)
Bird Grain (R)

References

External links
United Utilities

Geography of the Metropolitan Borough of Oldham
Valleys of the Peak District
Saddleworth
Valleys of Greater Manchester
1